Stephanie Nemtsova (born 15 April 1998) is an American former professional tennis player.

Nemtsova has a career-high singles ranking of world No. 946, achieved on 9 April 2018, and a career-high WTA doubles ranking of 622, reached on 28 August 2017.

She made her WTA Tour main-draw debut at the 2017 Copa Colsanitas, in the doubles draw partnering Alyssa Mayo.

ITF finals

Doubles: 4 (2–2)

External links
 
 

1998 births
Living people
American female tennis players
American people of Russian descent
21st-century American women